In mathematics, the graph structure theorem is a major result in the area of graph theory. The result establishes a deep and fundamental connection between the theory of graph minors and topological embeddings. The theorem is stated in the seventeenth of a series of 23 papers by Neil Robertson and Paul Seymour.

Setup and motivation for the theorem 
If  does not have a graph  as a minor, then we say that  is  -free. Let  be a fixed graph. Intuitively, if  is a huge -free graph, then there ought to be a "good reason" for this. In essence, every -free graph  suffers from one of two structural deficiencies: either  is "too thin" to have  as a minor, or  can be (almost) topologically embedded on a surface that is too simple to embed  upon. The first reason applies if  is a planar graph, and both reasons apply if  is not planar. We first make precise these notions.

Tree width 
For example, a connected graph  has tree width one if and only if it is a tree, and  has tree width two if and only if it is a series–parallel graph. Intuitively, a huge graph  has small tree width if and only if  takes the structure of a huge tree whose nodes and edges have been replaced by small graphs. We give a precise definition of tree width in the subsection regarding clique-sums. The graph structure theorem implies that this reason always applies in case  is planar.

Corollary 1.

This is one reason that the graph structure theorem is said to describe the "rough structure" of -free graphs.

Surface embeddings 
Roughly, a surface is a set of points with a local topological structure of a disc. Surfaces fall into two infinite families: the orientable surfaces include the sphere, the torus, the double torus and so on; the nonorientable surfaces include the real projective plane, the Klein bottle and so on. A graph embeds on a surface if the graph can be drawn on the surface as a set of points (vertices) and arcs (edges) that do not cross or touch each other, except where edges and vertices are incident or adjacent. A graph is planar if it embeds on the sphere. If a graph  embeds on a particular surface then every minor of  also embeds on that same surface.

When  is not planar, the graph structure theorem may be looked at as a vast generalization of the Kuratowski theorem. A version of this theorem proved by  states that if a graph  is both -free and -free, then  is planar. Unfortunately, this notion of "good reason" is not sophisticated enough for the graph structure theorem. Two more notions are required: clique-sums and vortices.

Clique-sums 

If  is a list of graphs, then we may produce a new graph by joining the list of graphs via -clique-sums. A graph has tree width at most   if it can be obtained via -clique-sums from a list of graphs, where each graph in the list has at most  vertices.

Corollary 1 indicates to us that -clique-sums of small graphs describe the rough structure -free graphs when  is planar.  When  is nonplanar, we also need to consider -clique-sums of a list of graphs, each of which is embedded on a surface. The following example with  illustrates this point. The graph  embeds on every surface except for the sphere.  However there exist -free graphs that are far from planar.  In particular, the 3-clique-sum of any list of planar graphs results in a -free graph.  determined the precise structure of -free graphs, as part of a cluster of results known as Wagner's theorem:

Theorem 2. If  is -free, then  can be obtained via 3-clique-sums from a list of planar graphs, and copies of one special non-planar graph having 8-vertices.

We point out that Theorem 2 is an exact structure theorem since the precise structure of -free graphs is determined. Such results are rare within graph theory.  The graph structure theorem is not precise in this sense because, for most graphs , the structural description of -free graphs includes some graphs that are not -free.

Vortices (rough description) 
Perhaps it is true that: for any non-planar graph , there exists a positive integer  such that every -free graph can be obtained via -clique-sums from a list of graphs, each of which either has at most  vertices or embeds on some surface that  does not embed on. Unfortunately, this statement is not yet sophisticated enough to be true. We must allow each embedded graph  to "cheat" in two limited ways. First, we must allow a bounded number of locations on the surface at which we may add some new vertices and edges that are permitted to cross each other in a manner of limited complexity. Such locations are called vortices. The "complexity" of a vortex is limited by a parameter called its depth, closely related to pathwidth. The reader may prefer to defer reading the following precise description of a vortex of depth . Second, we must allow a limited number of new vertices to add to each of the embedded graphs with vortices.

Vortices (precise definition) 
A face of an embedded graph is an open 2-cell in the surface that is disjoint from the graph, but whose boundary is the union of some of the edges of the embedded graph. We construct a new graph as follows.

Statement of the graph structure theorem 

Graph structure theorem. For any graph , there exists a positive integer  such that every -free graph can be obtained as follows:
 We start with a list of graphs, where each graph in the list is embedded on a surface on which  does not embed
 to each embedded graph in the list, we add at most  vortices, where each vortex has depth at most 
 to each resulting graph we add at most  new vertices (called apexes) and add any number of edges, each having at least one of its endpoints among the apexes. finally, we join via -clique-sums the resulting list of graphs.''

Note that steps 1. and 2. result in an empty graph if  is planar, but the bounded number of vertices added in step 3. makes the statement consistent with Corollary 1.

Refinements
Strengthened versions of the graph structure theorem are possible depending on the set  of forbidden minors. When one of the graphs in  can be drawn in the plane with only a single crossing, then the -minor-free graphs admit a decomposition as a clique-sum of graphs of constant size and graphs of bounded genus, without vortices.

See also 
Robertson–Seymour theorem

Notes

References 
.
.
.
.
.
.
.
.
.
.
.
.
.
.
.
.
.
.
.

.
.
.
.
.
.
.
.
.

Graph minor theory
Theorems in graph theory